, also known as Alice Academy or Alice School, is a Japanese manga series written and illustrated by Tachibana Higuchi, serialized in the shōjo manga magazine Hana to Yume from 2003 to 2013. It was adapted into an anime series produced by Aniplex and Group TAC which originally premiered on NHK BS-2. It spanned twenty-six episodes that aired between October 30, 2004 and May 14, 2005. The anime was translated and dubbed into English by the anime television network Animax and broadcast on networks throughout Asia. At Anime Expo 2008, The Right Stuf International announced that its Nozomi Entertainment division had licensed Gakuen Alice for the North American market.

In 2015, a spin-off called , was started. It takes place a few months from the end of Gakuen Alice, and features a new set of characters. The plot follows Andou Hikari, who is searching for her brother, who was taken away when she was a child due to his having an Alice. She eventually takes advantage of a one in a lifetime opportunity, for normal people to join an Alice music academy, hoping to find her brother.

Plot 

Mikan Sakura grew up with her grandfather in the Japanese countryside. When her best friend, Hotaru Imai, transfers to a prestigious school in Tokyo, Mikan follows her. The school is actually an elite Academy for gifted people with "Alices," an ability that is unique depending on the individual being. Once Mikan arrives at the gates of the school, she encounters an Alice teacher named Narumi, gets enrolled due to a series of events, and is told that she possesses a rare Alice. Despite her initial view of the so-called greatness to the school, Mikan slowly discovers that beneath the grand facade of the Academy, there is a never-ending stream of lies and buried secrets. The school's increasingly manipulative and sinister actions towards her make it a dangerous place to be. Little does Mikan know that her enrollment in Alice Academy set the gears in motion to an even greater tragedy. As she discovers the reality of the "Alices", she also unfolds her heritage and how it is connected to the academy. As the mystery of the academy draws her into an endless pit of misery and series of trials to survive, she also discovers how the strength of friendship is important to her and guides her to her destiny.

Media

Manga 

Written and illustrated by Tachibana Higuchi, the chapters of Gakuen Alice are published in the Japanese manga anthology Hana to Yume by Hakusensha and are collected in tankōbon. Thirty One volumes have been released as of March 2013.

Gakuen Alice was licensed for an English-language release in North America by Tokyopop before the company shut down. Sixteen volumes were published. This title is currently available to be licensed.

The manga is also licensed for a Spanish and German-language release

Anime 

A 26-episode anime television series directed by Takahiro Omori aired from October 20, 2004 to May 14, 2005.

The series uses two pieces of theme music. The opening theme, "Pikapika no Taiyou" (Shining Sun), is performed by Kana Ueda, the protagonist's voice actress. The ending theme, "Shiawase no Niji" (Rainbow of Happiness), is performed by Kana Ueda and Rie Kugimiya.

The entire series was released as a five DVD Japanese language only set in North America on July 7, 2009.

Fanbooks 

An official fanbook (Volume 7.5) was published in March 2005. Data in the first official fanbook is accurate up to Volume 7 of the series. A special fanbook titled Gakuen Alice SP Fanbook released as a furoku in Hana to Yume magazine. A second official fanbook (Volume 25.5) was published in September 2011. Data in the second fanbook is accurate up to Volume 25 of the series. An official illustrated fan book (artbook) was released in May 2007. Another illustrated book (ehon) was released in October 2011.

CDs 
A soundtrack for the series was released on March 2, 2005. A single of the opening theme and ending theme were also released.

Three drama CDs were broadcast on a web radio. On January 18, 2006, Sony Music Entertainment released the first drama CD.

Video games 
Gakuen Alice ~Kira Kira Memory Kiss~ was released on June 22, 2006, for the PlayStation 2 in Japan. There is also a Game Boy Advance game that has also only been released in Japan called Gakuen Alice ~Doki Doki Fushigi Taiken~. On April 19, 2007, a Nintendo DS game called Gakuen Alice: Waku Waku Happy Friends was released in Japan.

Reception 
The manga had over 7 million copies in print as of 2013.

References

External links 
 Aniplex's official website for Gakuen Alice  
 NHK's official website on Gakuen Alice 
 Animax India's official website for Gakuen Alice
 Official Gakuen Alice ~Kira Kira Memory Kiss~ Playstation 2 Game Homepage 
 Official website for Gakuen Alice at Enoki Films
 Right Stuf/Nozomi's Official Gakuen Alice Website
 

 
2003 manga
2004 anime television series debuts
2005 Japanese television series endings
Anime series based on manga
Aniplex
Game Boy Advance games
Group TAC
Hakusensha franchises
Hakusensha manga
Japan-exclusive video games
NHK original programming
PlayStation 2 games
Shōjo manga
Tokyopop titles
Video games developed in Japan